Serrù Lake is a lake in the Province of Turin, Piedmont, Italy.

Lakes of Piedmont